Livengood is a surname. Notable people with the surname include:

Henry Livengood (1933–1988), American politician
Scott Livengood (born 1952), American chief executive officer
Victoria Livengood (born 1959), American opera singer
Wes Livengood (1910–1996), American baseball player, scout and manager